Bremen Neustadt is a railway station located in Bremen, Germany. The station is located on the Oldenburg–Bremen railway. The train services are operated by NordWestBahn. The station has been part of the Bremen S-Bahn since December 2010.

Train services
The following services currently call at the station:

Local services  Osnabrück - Bramsche - Vechta - Delmenhorst - Bremen
Bremen S-Bahn services  Bad Zwischenahn - Oldenburg - Delmenhorst - Bremen

References

Railway stations in Bremen (state)
Bremen S-Bahn